Boris Yakovlevich Dubrovsky (born 8 October 1939) is a retired Russian rower who had his best achievements in the double sculls, partnering with Oleg Tyurin. In this event, they won an Olympic gold in 1964 and four medals at European and world championships in 1962–1965.

Biography
Dubrovsky was born to teachers Yakov Vasilievich Dubrovsky (1903–?) and Natalya Timofeevna Kuvaeva (1909–?) and has a sister Masha (born 1941). He has a PhD in theoretical physics, and from 1967 to 2003 taught calculus in a university. There he met his wife, Evgeniya Aleksandrovna, a mathematician. They have a son, Timofei (born 1964), who moved to the United States in the 1990s.

References

External links
 

1939 births
Living people
Russian male rowers
Soviet male rowers
Olympic rowers of the Soviet Union
Rowers at the 1964 Summer Olympics
Olympic gold medalists for the Soviet Union
Olympic medalists in rowing
World Rowing Championships medalists for the Soviet Union
Medalists at the 1964 Summer Olympics
European Rowing Championships medalists